Cynometra cauliflora is a small, cauliflorous tree with a thick, heavily branched stem, and rather small flowers, about  across, that appear on the stem in clusters. It is known in Indonesian as namu-namu, after the flattened, crescent shaped pods, which look similar to the Indonesian pastry, namu-namu. In the city of Ternate, it is called namo-namo, and ñam-ñam in the Maldives. It is a species of the genus Cynometra, native to Malaysia, and found mainly in northern peninsular Malaysia.

Foliage
Each leaf is made up of 2 leaflets, which if not examined closely may appear as two leaves. They are glossy and smooth, dark green with pale green undersides, and are a rosy pink when young.

Fruits

The pod does not split open readily, but a line is visible along the fruit and divides it into two. The texture of the skin is coriaceous and uneven, colored a pale greenish/yellow to brown. The pod is edible, with aromatic and juicy yellow pulp, and relatively large seeds.

Propagation
The tree is usually grown from seed, although it can be propagated by budding, approach grafting and other methods.

External links

Singapore National Parks Board

References 

cauliflora
Plants described in 1753
Taxa named by Carl Linnaeus
Cauliflory